"Someone Is Looking for Someone Like You" is a song written and recorded by American country artist Gail Davies. The song was released as a single in January 1979 on Lifesong Records.

"Someone Is Looking for Someone Like You" was recorded at the Sound Stage Studio in Nashville, Tennessee, United States in August 1978. The song was issued as a single in January 1979, reaching number eleven on the Billboard Magazine Hot Country Singles chart. The song was the third single released from her self-titled studio album. It became Davies' first major hit as a musical artist, helping to establish her career as a country music performer throughout the 1980s.

Chart performance

References 

1979 singles
Gail Davies songs
Songs written by Gail Davies
Song recordings produced by Tommy West (producer)